Stewart Lake is a lake in Crow Wing County, in the U.S. state of Minnesota.

Stewart Lake was named for Charles Stewart, a naval officer in the War of 1812.

See also
List of lakes in Minnesota

References

Lakes of Minnesota
Lakes of Crow Wing County, Minnesota